Club Atlético Paraná, mostly known as "Atlético Paraná" is an Argentine football club located in the city of Paraná, Entre Ríos. In December 2014, the club was promoted to Primera B Nacional after beating Sportivo Patria of Formosa by 5–1. The club plays its home games at Estadio Pedro Mutio, which has a capacity of 6,000 people. Atlético Paraná's main rivals are Club Atlético Belgrano and Patronato, both from the city of Paraná. Both teams have played many matches in the local league.

History
The team played in the Torneo Argentino B during the 2000s, winning the tournament in the 2013–14 season. In 2014 Atlético Paraná played the Torneo Federal A, the successor of defunct Torneo Argentino A.

Atlético Paraná also took part of the 2011–12 Copa Argentina, qualifying to the final stage where the squad lost to Banfield by 2–1.

After defeating Unión de Villa Krause of San Juan by penalty shoot-out, Atlético Paraná qualified to play the Torneo Federal A. In the Federal A, Atlético finished 3rd. in Zona 4, qualifying to the playoffs.
In February 2022 they won the Regional tournament after beating Juventud Alianza 3–0 in the final. Their most outstanding players in the tournament were Gustavo Vergara, Damian Schvindt, Marcos Minetti, Leonardo Mansilla, Joaquín Clavijo Gerlo and Pablo Stupiski.

Honours

National
Torneo Argentino B (1): 2013–14

Regional
Liga Paranaense de Fútbol (22): 1949, 1951, 1956, 1961, 1962, 1963, 1971, 1973, 1975, 1976, 1978, 1979, 1980, 1983, 1993, 1999, 2000, 2002, 2003, 2004, 2005, 2008
Copa del Centenario (1): 1910
Copa Ernesto Montiel (1): 1918
Copa Gath & Chaves (1): 1924
Copa Federación Paranaense (1): 1931
Copa LT 14 (1): 1945
Copa Pancho Uranga (1): 1945
Copa Olavarría (1): 1947

References

External links

Official website

 
A
A
Paraná, Entre Ríos